Elias and Mikael Ymer were the defending champions, but lost in the first round to Marc López and Fernando Verdasco.

Oliver Marach and Mate Pavić won the title, defeating Aisam-ul-Haq Qureshi and Jean-Julien Rojer in the final, 3−6, 7−6(8−6), [10−4].

Seeds

Draw

Draw

References

External links
 Main draw

Stockholm Open - Doubles
Doubles